Hardy Sauter (born February 25, 1971) is an American-born Canadian former professional ice hockey defenseman and coach.

Playing career
Sauter was born in Dayton, Ohio, but moved to Maryfield, Saskatchewan at a young age.

Sauter played junior hockey with the Brandon Wheat Kings and Spokane Chiefs of the Western Hockey League. He made his professional debut with the ECHL Tallahassee Tiger Sharks during the 1995–96 season. Sauter also played for the Houston Aeros in the International Hockey League.

As a player, Sauter was best known as a member of the Oklahoma City Blazers in the Central Hockey League. Sauter played in 590 games with the Blazers between 1996 and 2005, retiring as the CHL's all-time scoring leader among defensemen and in the league's all-time top 10 overall in assists and points. Sauter was elected to the CHL Hall of Fame in 2013.

Coaching career

Immediately after retiring from the Blazers in 2005 Sauter accepted the head coaching position with the Nipawin Hawks of the Saskatchewan Junior Hockey League. In 2007 Sauter was hired as an assistant coach by the Spokane Chiefs and promoted to head coach the following season, but was fired in 2010.

Later in 2010 Sauter became head coach of the ECHL Idaho Steelheads. Sauter compiled a 63-59-22 record in two seasons in Idaho, but failed to take the team past the second round in the ECHL playoffs. The Steelheads declined to renew his contract after the 2011–12 season.

References

External link

1971 births
Living people
Canadian expatriate ice hockey players in the United States
Canadian ice hockey coaches
Canadian ice hockey defencemen
Denver Daredevils players
ECHL coaches
Houston Aeros (1994–2013) players
Ice hockey people from Saskatchewan
Oklahoma City Blazers (1992–2009) players
Spokane Chiefs coaches
Tallahassee Tiger Sharks players
Sacramento River Rats players